The 16mm feature film,  Kill the Moonlight, completed in 1991, is an unconventional comedy about a loser stock car racer. It starts normal enough, like a low budget drive-in movie from the 70's, but as the film unfolds, the main character starts to unravel in strange ways when he is contaminated by toxic waste. At the same time, the plot of the film disintegrates and scenes start to go out of sync, and the picture goes upside down and backwards at times. Sort of like a folk song turning into an experimental noise jam. Two of the film's characters are sampled in Beck's hit song "Loser". The film was unprinted and seen by very few until 1994 when it premiered at the Rome Italy Film Festival.

Synopsis

A stock car racer blows a rod and his car catches fire. To raise money to get back into the game he works as fish hatchery worker, toxic waste cleaner, drug peddler and thief. Director Steve Hanft, captures the ridiculous life of a complete and total loser in slices of life as his surreal illegal days unfold in a different kind of narrative that casually leaves out plot and resolution.

Cast
Thomas Hendrix as Chance
Maria Hassabi as Sandra
Ross Harris as Ross
Richmond Arquette as Sandra's boyfriend
Jaime Colindrez as Jaime
Beata Henrichs as Cindy
Ralston Regan as Chance's father
Eddie Ruscha as Surf bassist

Soundtrack
First issued by Sympathy for the Record Industry in 1997, the out of print soundtrack to Kill The Moonlight was reissued with the Plexifilm DVD release, this time including tracks from Beck and Steve Hanft's band Loser.

 Beck - "Leave Me On The Moon"
 The Pussywillows - "Vindaloo"
 The Dynamics - "Tube Glory"
 The Raunch Hands - "Green Room"
 Pam Aronoff - "TV Jazz"
 Go To Blazes - "Hating You"
 Loser - "Born Of Whiskey"
 Beck - "Last Night I Traded My Soul's Innermost for Some Pickled Fish"
 Delta Garage - "Blue Eyes"
 Thomas Hendrix - "Kill The Moonlight Sample"
 The World Famous Blue Jays - "Cookin' With Jay"
 Go To Blazes - "Bad Cup of Coffee"
 Beck - "Underwater Music"
 Loser - "Dad Came Home"
 Martha Atwell - "Wildwood Flower"
 Thomas Hendrix - "Can't Find My Car"
 Pam Aronoff - "Clear"
 Loser - "Fish Bait"
 The Dynamics - "Spaghetti Ride"

External links

Plexifilm, distributor

 

American independent films
American auto racing films
1990s English-language films
1990s American films